The Spectrum is the second studio album by British recording artist Daley. It was released on 14 July 2017 through BMG and The End Records.

Critical reception 
The Spectrum received generally mixed reviews from music critics. Spectrum Culture editor Daniel Bromfield called that it a "frustratingly generic R&B album and not a terribly well thought-out one."  He rated the album three stars out of five and wrote that "most of the best moments on the album are sourced directly from [Daley's] throat, in part because of the beauty of his vocals and in part because there’s not much else to grab one here."

Track listing 
Credits adapted from the liner notes of The Spectrum.

Charts

References

External links 
 

2017 albums
Daley (musician) albums